Deniz Doğan Mehmet (born 19 September 1992) is a professional footballer who plays as a goalkeeper for  club Dunfermline Athletic.

A former youth team player at Arsenal, Charlton Athletic, Manchester United, and West Ham United, Mehmet then signed for Welling United for a brief spell in 2011. Having represented Turkey up to under-19 level, English-born Mehmet then spent four years in Turkey as a reserve goalkeeper at Kayserispor. Mehmet then signed for Scottish club Falkirk in January 2016, where he stayed for one year. Mehmet then returned to England to sign for Port Vale in March 2017, before signing for Dundee United later that same year. He joined Queen of the South in March 2019, before returning to Dundee United four months later. He sat on the bench as United won the Scottish Championship in the 2019–20 season. He joined Dunfermline Athletic in June 2021.

Early life
Mehmet was born in Enfield, London, on 19 September 1992 and he is of Turkish Cypriot descent.

Club career
Mehmet was associated with the youth academies at Arsenal, Charlton Athletic, and Manchester United, before he joined the youth academy at West Ham United in 2008. Mehmet departed West Ham in the 2011 close season and had trials with Ipswich Town and Wycombe Wanderers that summer. He then signed for Welling United of the Conference South. Mehmet departed Welling to sign for Turkish Süper Lig club Kayserispor. He departed the Turkish club in January 2015, having played ten cup matches in four seasons.

Mehmet then had trials with Luton Town and Leyton Orient in the 2015 close season and then went on to have a trial with Plymouth Argyle in October 2015 and featured for the club in the Under-21 Premier League Cup. He then signed for Scottish Championship club Falkirk in January 2016 after a one-month trial. Mehmet was unable to replace first-choice goalkeeper Danny Rogers and departed the club by mutual consent in January 2017, after informing manager Peter Houston that he wanted to play regular matches elsewhere.

Mehmet then signed a short-term contract with EFL League One club Port Vale on 1 March 2017, with the intention of being the back-up to on loan goalkeeper Leo Fasan. Mehmet debuted for Port Vale in a crucial 2–1 win versus relegation rivals Shrewsbury Town at Vale Park on 17 March 2017. One week later, he impressed in a 0–0 home draw versus Milton Keynes Dons, which was the club's first clean sheet in fourteen matches. Mehmet was released by manager Michael Brown, following the club's relegation in May 2017.

Mehmet signed a one-year contract with Scottish Championship side Dundee United, after impressing after a trial in July 2017. He was restricted to cup appearances in the first part of the 2017–18 season, despite expecting a better opportunity when Csaba László replaced Ray McKinnon as manager in November 2017, although he explained that the change in management had little effect on him as he spent most of his time at Tannadice with goalkeeping coach Stuart Garden. Mehmet eventually staked his claim as first-team goalkeeper towards the end of that season, as United defeated Dunfermline Athletic in the play-off quarter-finals but had to be substituted for Harry Lewis just under an hour into the second leg, after he injured himself celebrating Scott McDonald's equalising goal. Manager Laszlo stated that "this was the funniest thing he had seen in football and was really stupid". Mehmet signed a new one-year contract with Dundee United in May 2018, however the torn cruciate ligament injury he sustained in the play-offs left him unable to feature during the first half of the 2018–19 season. Manager Robbie Neilson gave him a six-month contract extension to help him through his rehabilitation.

On 29 March 2019, Mehmet signed for Queen of the South until the end of the 2018–19 season and Queens manager Gary Naysmith explained that he signed him after first-team goalkeeper Martin and third-choice goalkeeper Ryan Gibson both picked up injuries. He rejoined Dundee United on 5 July 2019 signing a two-year contract; sporting director Tony Asghar explained that he was allowed to leave the club in order to prove his fitness, and having done so he was re-signed to provide competition for first-choice goalkeeper Benjamin Siegrist. However Siegrist played all 28 league games in the 2019–20 season as United were declared as league champions with eight games left to play due to the COVID-19 pandemic in Scotland. Mehmet made four league and eight cup appearances throughout the 2020–21 campaign, including playing in a Scottish Cup semi-final defeat to Hibernian.  However he decided to leave Tannadice after concluding that "it just wasn’t happening for me at Dundee United" with manager Micky Mellon settled on playing Siegrist in goal.

On 23 June 2021, Mehmet signed for Scottish Championship side Dunfermline Athletic on a two-year deal, arriving as Peter Grant second signing of the summer. Veteran goalkeeper Owain Fôn Williams left East End Park in February, though Jakub Stolarczyk was selected as his replacement as Mehmet was out with a finger injury. Manager John Hughes praised Mehmet for his performances filling in whilst Stolarczyk was away on international duty. He featured eight times in the 2021–22 relegation campaign.

International career
Mehmet has been capped by Turkey at under-16, under-17, under-18, and under-19 level. He was selected by Abdullah Ercan as a squad member for the 2009 UEFA European Under-17 Championship in Germany and the 2009 FIFA U-17 World Cup in Nigeria.

Career statistics

Honours
Kayserispor
TFF First League: 2014–15

Falkirk
Scottish Championship second-place promotion: 2015–16

Dundee United
Scottish Championship: 2019–20

References

1992 births
Living people
Footballers from the London Borough of Enfield
English footballers
Turkish footballers
Sportspeople of Turkish Cypriot descent
English people of Turkish Cypriot descent
Turkey youth international footballers
Association football goalkeepers
Arsenal F.C. players
Charlton Athletic F.C. players
Manchester United F.C. players
West Ham United F.C. players
Welling United F.C. players
Kayserispor footballers
Falkirk F.C. players
Port Vale F.C. players
Dundee United F.C. players
Queen of the South F.C. players
Dunfermline Athletic F.C. players
Scottish Professional Football League players
English Football League players
Turkish expatriate sportspeople in Scotland